The 1985 Minnesota Golden Gophers football team represented the University of Minnesota in the 1985 Big Ten Conference football season. In their second and final year under head coach Lou Holtz, the Golden Gophers compiled a 7–5 record and outscored their opponents by a combined total of 293 to 240.
 
When former Minnesota head coach Lou Holtz left the Golden Gophers to coach at the University of Notre Dame, assistant John Gutekunst was tapped to coach the Golden Gophers in the Independence Bowl.  Attendance was 42,845.

Quarterback Rickey Foggie was named offensive player of the game, while linebacker Bruce Holmes was named defensive player of the game.
Center Ray Hitchcock, linebacker Peter Najarian, offensive guard Jon Lilleberg and strong safety Larry Joyner were named All-Big Ten second team. Running back David Puk was named Academic All-American second team. Puk and linebacker Peter Najarian were named Academic All-Big Ten.

Quarterback Rickey Foggie was awarded the Bronko Nagurski Trophy.  Ray Hitchcock was awarded the Bruce Smith Award. Peter Najarian was awarded the Carl Eller Award. Kicker Chip Lohmiller was awarded the Bobby Bell Award.  Flanker . Andy Hare was awarded the Butch Nash Award. David Puk was awarded the Paul Giel Award.

The total attendance was 426,918, which averaged out to 60,985 per game. The season high for attendance was against rival Wisconsin.

Schedule

Personnel

Season summary

Wichita State

Montana

Oklahoma

Purdue

at Northwestern

at Indiana

Ohio State

at Michigan State

Wisconsin

Michigan

at Iowa

Independence Bowl (vs Clemson)

References

Minnesota
Minnesota Golden Gophers football seasons
Independence Bowl champion seasons
Minnesota Golden Gophers football